The North East Wales Football League represents the North East Wales area at the fourth and fifth tiers of the Welsh football league system. It was established in 2020 as a successor to the North East Wales League following a reorganisation of the Welsh football pyramid. The league has two divisions:
the Premier Division at Tier 4, which offers a promotion route to the Tier 3 Ardal Leagues, and
the League Championship at Tier 5.

History
The league was established in 2020. After the member clubs for the first season were announced, the list was amended before the season was due to commence due to clubs folding and moving divisions. The proposed inaugural season was abandoned due to the Coronavirus pandemic. It was eventually launched in July 2021 for the 2021–22 season with some changes to the list of participating teams.

Member clubs for 2022-23 season

North East Wales Football League Premier Division

North East Wales Football League Championship

Acton
Aston Park Rangers
Bellevue
Caerwys
Gronant
FC United of Wrexham
Holywell United
Johnstown Youth
Overton Recreation
Ruabon Rovers
Saltney Ferry
Sychdyn

Premier League Champions

2020s

2020-21: – Competition not played – Covid-19 pandemic
2021-22: – Greenfield

Championship winners

2020s

2020-21: – Competition not played – Covid-19 pandemic
2021-22: – Connahs Quay Town

Cup Competitions

2020s

2020-21: Season void
2021-22: 
Premier Cup –  Cefn Mawr Rangers
Championship: –

Former clubs
The inaugural 2021–22 season saw a number of clubs resigning from the league structure. Premier Division club Brymbo Victoria left the league in August 2021 and dissolved and  Chirk Town also resigned from the Premier Division late in the season and folded. In the Championship AFC Bagillt resigned in October 2021, Railway Rovers in March 2022 and both Borras Park Albion and Brymbo Lodge in April 2022.

Ahead of the 2022–23 season Cefn Mawr Rangers also resigned from the league.

See also
Football in Wales
Welsh football league system

References

External links
League website

 
4
5
Wales
Wales
Sports leagues established in 2020
2020 establishments in Wales